Achuthappa Nayak was the Thanjavur Nayak king who ruled from 1560 to 1614. From 1560 to 1580, he was co-monarch along with his father and from 1580 to 1614, he ruled on his own. His reign is generally regarded as one of peace and stability.

Personal  life 

Achuthappa Nayak was the eldest son of Sevappa Nayak, the Vijayanagar feudatory of Arcot who founded the Thanjavur Nayak dynasty. His principal queen was Murtimamba.

Names 

Achuthappa Nayak was named by Sevappa Nayak after the Vijayanagar Emperor Achyuta Deva Raya.  During his lifetime, Achuthappa Nayak was also known as Chinna Seva Achyutha and Sevappa Achyutha.

Reign 

Achuthappa ruled for a total of 54 years during which Thanjavur experienced architectural and cultural development. While the earlier part of his reign was peaceful, there was warfare with Muslim and Portuguese invaders towards the end. He maintained peaceful relations with the Vijayanagar kings and assisted them in their campaigns. Achuthappa was assisted by his minister, the legendary Govinda Dikshitar.

Battle of Vallamprakara 

In 1579, the Madurai Nayak king Virappa Nayak declared his independence from Vijayanagar. Achuthappa fought Virappa along with the Vijayanagar Emperor Venkata II at Vallamprakara (the present-day Vallam near Thanjavur) and defeated him. This battle is not mentioned in any of Achuthappa's own inscriptions and the only references to this war are found in the Pudukkottai plates of Adivirarama Srivallabha and Varathungarama, both dated 1583. The validity of these plates have since been questioned as Venkatapathi did not ascend the throne till 1586.

Campaign against the Portuguese 

The Sahityaratnakara describe Achuthappa's victory over Parasikas at Nagapattinam. Ramabadramba too refers to the campaign but names Achuthappa's enemies as "Parangi", the Tamil word used for colonial Europeans. During the early 17th century, the Portuguese were waging a concentrated campaign to conquer Jaffna and Achuthappa's attack on Nagapattinam might have been launched to assist the king of Jaffna. To supplant the Portuguese, Achuthappa also maintained friendly relations with the Dutch towards the end of his reign.

Art and architecture 

On the whole, however, the kingdom progressed during Achuthappa's reign. Achuthappa built the Thiraikattuvar Mandapam in the Vilanagar temple in 1608 and made generous land grants to the Margasahayeshwara Temple at Muvalur near Mayiladuthurai, Thirumulasthana Temple at Chidambaram and Panaipakkam Temple. The Sangitha Sudha says that Achuthappa Nayak was an ardent devotee of the Hindu god Ranganatha right from his boyhood. Achuthappa constructed the golden vimana and gopuras around the Ranganathaswamy Temple, Srirangam and constructed the flight of steps leading to the Cauvery. He constructed Pushyamantapas to feed poor Brahmins in the towns of Mayiladuthurai, Thiruvidaimarudur, Kumbakonam and Tiruvadi. He also constructed a dam across the Cauvery near the town of Tiruvadi in order to facilitate irrigation and endowed agraharas all over the kingdom.

Literature flourished during his reign. The works Sahityaratnakara and Raghunathabyudayam give a detailed picture of life in the Thanjavur Nayak kingdom. They describe the whole kingdom as a "paddy forest" (Salivanam).

Later life 

According to sources, Achuthappa abdicated following the death of the Vijayanagar Emperor Venkatapathi in 1614 and anointed his son Raghunatha Nayak as the next ruler. According to the Sahityaratnakara, Achuthappa retired to Srirangam upon abdication spending the rest of his life discoursing with Hindu scholars. The Raghunathabyudayam says that Raghunatha Nayak approached Achuthappa to seek his blessings after the Battle of Toppur in 1617. It is assumed that Achuthappa must have died after that date.

References 

 

Asian kings
Thanjavur Maratha kingdom